William Sherman (born May 27, 1999) is an American football offensive tackle for the Denver Broncos of the National Football League (NFL). He played college football at Colorado, and was selected by the New England Patriots in the sixth round of the 2021 NFL Draft.

High school
Sherman attended Allen High School under coach Terry Gambill, where he was teammates with Greg Little and Kyler Murray. He played varsity every year except his freshman one.
He also threw the shot put and discus in track & field for Allen High School.

Professional career

New England Patriots
Sherman was drafted in the sixth round, 197th overall, of the 2021 NFL Draft by the New England Patriots. On May 11, 2021, Sherman officially signed with the Patriots. He was waived on August 31, 2021 and re-signed to the practice squad. He signed a reserve/future contract with the Patriots on January 17, 2022.

On August 30, 2022, Sherman was waived by the Patriots.

Denver Broncos
On September 1, 2022, Sherman signed with the Denver Broncos practice squad. He was promoted to the active roster on January 3, 2023.

References

External links
Colorado Buffaloes bio

Living people
1999 births
New England Patriots players
American football offensive tackles
People from Allen, Texas
Players of American football from Texas
Sportspeople from the Dallas–Fort Worth metroplex
Colorado Buffaloes football players
Denver Broncos players